The Chief Secretary of Maharashtra is the top-most executive official and senior-most civil servant of the Maharashtra State. The Chief Secretary is the ex-officio head of the state Civil Services Board, the State Secretariat, the state cadre Indian Administrative Service and all civil services under the rules of business of the state government. The Chief Secretary acts as the principal advisor to the chief minister on all matters of state administration.

The Chief Secretary is the officer of Indian Administrative Service. The Chief Secretary is the senior-most cadre post in the state administration, ranking 23rd on the Indian order of precedence. The Chief Secretary acts as an ex-officio secretary to the state cabinet, therefore called "Secretary to the Cabinet". The status of this post is equal to that of a Secretary to the Government of India.

Chief secretaries
Manu Kumar Srivastava was appointed Chief Secretary of the Government of Maharashtra on 28 February 2022.

List of former Chief Secretaries of Maharashtra
Johny Joseph
30 April 2007 – 30 November 2009

JP Dange
30 November 2009 – 2011
Jairaj Pathak
Bhushan Gagrani 
Ajoy Mehta
10 May 2019 – 20 July 2020
 Sanjay kumar
20 July 2020 – 28 February 2021
 Sitaram Kunte
28 February 2021 – 30 November 2021
 Debashish Chakrabarty - Acting
30 November 2021 - 28 February 2022
Manu Kumar Srivastava
28 February 2022 - incumbent

References 

Government of Maharashtra
Indian Administrative Service officers